Tor Burman (4 April 1921 – 6 January 1995) was a Swedish equestrian. He competed in two events at the 1956 Summer Olympics.

References

External links
 

1921 births
1995 deaths
Swedish male equestrians
Olympic equestrians of Sweden
Equestrians at the 1956 Summer Olympics
People from Sollefteå Municipality
Sportspeople from Västernorrland County